Annona hayesii is a species of plant from the jungles of Panama. Fruits range in color from green to greenish-white, similar to other members of the Annonaceae family.  Very little is known about this species. It is unknown in cultivation, but may have potential.

References

Further reading
Bernal, R., S. R. Gradstein & M. Celis. (eds.) 2016. Cat. Pl. & Líq. Colombia I–II: 1–3056. Universidad Nacional de Colombia (Sede Bogotá), Instituto de Ciencias Naturales, Bogotá, Colombia.
Correa A., M.D., C. Galdames & M. Stapf. 2004. Cat. Pl. Vasc. Panamá 1–599. Smithsonian Tropical Research Institute, Panamá.
Croat, T. B. Flora of Barro Colorado Island. (F BarroColo)
Idárraga-Piedrahita, A., R. D. C. Ortiz, R. Callejas Posada & M. Merello. (eds.) 2011. Fl. Antioquia: Cat. 2: 9–939. Universidad de Antioquia, Medellín.
Maas, P. J. M. et al. 1994. Studies in Annonaceae. XXI. Index to species and infraspecific taxa of neotropical Annonaceae (Candollea) 49:401.
Ulloa Ulloa, C., P. Acevedo-Rodríguez, S. G. Beck, M. J. Belgrano, R. Bernal, P. E. Berry, L. Brako, M. Celis, G. Davidse, S. R. Gradstein, O. Hokche, B. León, S. León-Yánez, R. E. Magill, D. A. Neill, M. H. Nee, P. H. Raven, H. Stimmel, M. T. Strong, J. L. Villaseñor Ríos, J. L. Zarucchi, F. O. Zuloaga & P. M. Jørgensen. 2017. An integrated assessment of vascular plants species of the Americas. Science 358: 1614–1617, f. 1–4.
Woodson, R. E. & R. W. Schery, eds. Flora of Panama. (F Panama)

hayesii
Fauna of Panama
Plants described in 1925